Deinacrida pluvialis is a species of insect in family Anostostomatidae. It is endemic to New Zealand.

References

Weta
Anostostomatidae
Insects described in 1999